The Fades is a British supernatural drama television series created and written by Jack Thorne. The six episodes were first broadcast on BBC Three and BBC HD beginning 21 September 2011 and on BBC America from 14 January 2012. In April 2012, Johnny Harris confirmed that a second season had not been commissioned.

Plot
Paul, a student with a history of bedwetting, is haunted by apocalyptic dreams. He is able to see spirits of the dead, known as the Fades, all around him. The Fades cannot be seen, smelt, heard or touched by other humans – they are what is left of humans who have died but have not been able to ascend, because the ascension points on earth have been closing, and few can go through the ones that are still open. Because of this, the Fades left on Earth have become embittered and vengeful toward the human race, and have since developed a way to become partly human again and regain control of touch within the real world. They remain unseen in the world except to those special few like Paul, called "Angelics", who have the ability to perceive the Fades. Paul finds himself pulled into a conflict between the Angelics and the Fades, trying to prevent the Fades from regaining physical form and destroying the human race.

Production
Filming took place at various locations in Hertfordshire, England. The school scenes were filmed at Queens School, Bushey. The majority of the location filming took place in South Oxhey, Oxhey, Watford, Hemel Hempstead, and Hatfield. The abandoned shopping centre used in the first episode is Oriental City, in London.

Awards and nominations
The Fades won the BAFTA Award for Best Drama Series in 2012.

Characters
  
 Paul Roberts (Iain De Caestecker) Paul, the 17-year-old protagonist who discovers he is an Angelic, a human being who can perceive Fades, the spirits of the living who have not moved on to the afterlife.
 Michael "Mac" Armstrong (Daniel Kaluuya), Paul's best friend.
 Neil Valentine (Johnny Harris), an Angelic and Paul's mentor.
 Sarah Etches (Natalie Dormer), a Fade, who in life was an Angelic, and the wife of Mark.
 Mark Etches (Tom Ellis), Sarah's husband, and Paul's history teacher.
 Meg Roberts (Claire Rushbrook), mother of Paul and Anna
 Anna Roberts (Lily Loveless), Paul's twin sister.
 Jay (Sophie Wu), Anna's best friend, and the object of Paul's affection.
 John (Joe Dempsie), a Fade and the primary antagonist of the series.
 Natalie (Jenn Murray), a Fade, and follower of John.
 Helen (Daniela Nardini), an Angelic.
 DCI Armstrong (Robbie Gee), Mac's father and the detective working the cases of the dead and missing
 Steve McEwan (Chris Mason), Anna's boyfriend.

Episodes

Reception

Michael Deacon, of The Telegraph newspaper, described the opening episode as "promisingly tense."

Writing for The Guardian, Ben Dowell commented that the series proved that "It is difficult not to watch BBC3 and E4 and think channels which target the under 35s are emerging as amongst the best places for boldness and innovation in UK TV drama."

See also
 List of ghost films

References

External links

BBC The Fades Facebook page
The Fades on Twitter

2010s British drama television series
2010s British horror television series
2011 British television series debuts
2011 British television series endings
BBC television dramas
British supernatural television shows
British horror fiction television series
British fantasy television series
Television shows about dreams